Teretia cincta is an extinct species of sea snail, a marine gastropod mollusk in the family Raphitomidae.

Description
The length of the shell attains 10.6 mm, its diameter 5 mm.

(Original description in Italian) This species is very similar to Teretia anceps, but it must be distinguished by a less delicate shape, because the whorls are shorter and therefore relatively wider. The cinguli are thinner and more protruding. The interstices are much wider.

Distribution
Fossils of this marine species were found in Pliocene strata in Calabria, Italy

References

 Brunetti, M.; Vecchi, G. (2003). Sul ritrovamento di Teretia elengatissima (Foresti, 1868) in terreni pliocenici dell'Emilia e della Toscana. Bollettino della Società Paleontologica Italiana. 42: 49-57

External links
 Morassi M. & Bonfitto A. (2015). New Indo-Pacific species of the genus Teretia Norman, 1888 (Gastropoda: Raphitomidae). Zootaxa. 3911(4): 560-570 
 

cincta
Gastropods described in 1880